The North County Transit District (typically abbreviated as NCTD) is the agency responsible for public transportation in Northern San Diego County, California. The agency manages the COASTER commuter rail service between Oceanside and San Diego, the SPRINTER hybrid rail service between Escondido and Oceanside, the BREEZE transit bus service, LIFT paratransit service, and FLEX on-demand and point-deviation service.

NCTD owns  of mainline railroad track (the Surf Line) from the Orange County/San Diego County line to the San Diego Santa Fe Depot (used by COASTER, Metrolink, and Pacific Surfliner passenger trains along with BNSF Railway freight trains) along with the  Escondido Branch (used by the SPRINTER and BNSF freight trains).

NCTD also works closely with the San Diego Metropolitan Transit System (MTS) which operates public transit services in Southern San Diego County, and the San Diego Association of Governments (SANDAG) which plans, develops, and constructs transit projects for both the NCTD and MTS. NCTD’s rail services are directly operated by the agency, while bus services are operated under contract by MV Transportation.

History 
The North San Diego County Transit Development Board (NSDCTDB) was established in 1976 by California Senate Bill No. 802 to plan, construct, and operate public transit in North San Diego County.  The Board quickly acquired the municipal transit systems operated by the cities of Escondido and Oceanside. The Board also designed a regional transit system consisting of local and regional corridor routes to serve the transportation needs of North San Diego County.

In 1982, planning began for the Coast Express Rail (COASTER) commuter rail service. On June 2, 1994, the Board created a non-profit corporation called the San Diego Northern Railway (SDNR) to maintain, enhance, and operate the COASTER. SDNR purchased the tracks to be used by the COASTER from the Atchison, Topeka and Santa Fe Railway in 1994; SDNR was later dissolved in 2002. On February 27, 1995, COASTER service commenced.

On January 1, 2003, Senate Bill 1703 was enacted, transferring responsibility for future transit planning, programming, development, and construction to the San Diego Association of Governments (SANDAG), San Diego's regional planning agency. In 2005, the State Legislature changed NSDCTDB's name to the North County Transit District (NCTD).

In March 2008, after many years of planning, the SPRINTER hybrid rail line began service. FLEX on-demand service began in 2011.

In fiscal year 2009, NCTD projected annual operating deficits of more than $24 million by 2014. In response, NCTD made proactive changes to maintain transit services and related jobs, including reducing staff and renegotiating and restructuring various contracts. These changes closed a five-year, $80 million budget gap. The new business model also allowed NCTD to lower fares, increase service and ridership, and grow its financial reserves.

NCTD relies on public funding.  In 1987, voters approved the Proposition A TransNet Ordinance, which provided funding for future transit projects and improvements to the existing system.  In November 2004, voters approved a 40-year extension of the TransNet sales tax, which will allow NCTD to continue to operate service for many years.

In August 2018, NCTD announced that they were seeking public opinions and input on a re-brand of the agency. This included two new paint scheme ideas for COASTER, along with the existing scheme being used as a third option. The new COASTER livery was eventually chosen at the end of that year, and is currently being implemented on the legacy COASTER fleet, with the new locomotives and passenger cars set to arrive in the new livery as well. In addition to the COASTER livery re-branding, a new cross-platform NCTD website was launched in early 2019 as the agency reorganized itself to be more accessible with its services.

Services 
NCTD provides public transit in North San Diego County, from La Jolla and the Pacific Ocean, east to Escondido and Ramona, and from Oceanside and the Orange County border south through Del Mar to UCSD and La Jolla and University Town Center, with connections extending to downtown San Diego. NCTD offers the following services:

 BREEZE – Fixed-route bus services.
 COASTER – Commuter rail service from Oceanside to downtown San Diego.
 SPRINTER – Hybrid rail service from Escondido to Oceanside.
 LIFT – Paratransit service for those with disabilities who are unable to use the accessible fixed-route system.
 FLEX – On-demand service in Carlsbad and Ramona.

BREEZE Bus Service 
The BREEZE Bus Service serves as the main form of public road transportation for residents of North San Diego County. BREEZE service began in 1976 when NCTD acquired the municipal bus systems serving Escondido and Oceanside.

The annual ridership of BREEZE buses is 7.9 million people, with an average weekday ridership of 25,800 people. More than 2,600 bus stops and 9 transit centers service the BREEZE buses. As of October 2021, the fleet comprises 161 vehicles, including 143 compressed natural gas (CNG) buses.

The California Energy Commission awarded NCTD $4 million to build a hydrogen fueling station at BREEZE's main facility in Oceanside on May 19, 2021. Construction of the fueling station is expected to be completed in mid-2022. NCTD is also expected to order eight hydrogen-fueled electric buses and six battery-powered electric buses in the next 2 years.

In November 2009, NCTD approved outsourcing all bus and rail operations effective July 1, 2010, to First Transit. The agency anticipated saving $70 million over seven years with the move. Fleet and facility operators remained NCTD employees until their contracts expired June 30, 2011.

As of January 2013, NCTD offers 30 BREEZE bus routes plus 4 FLEX zones.

SPRINTER Hybrid Rail 

The SPRINTER is a  hybrid rail line that runs east and west between Escondido and Oceanside.  A total of 455 trains run every week.

The SPRINTER's first day of service was March 9, 2008.  The annual ridership was 2.5 million people in 2015, with an average weekday ridership of 8,300 people. Fifteen stations are served by the Sprinter route.  SPRINTER equipment includes 12 Siemens Desiro diesel multiple unit passenger trains. NCTD also owns a maintenance facility and rail yard for their Sprinter service in Escondido, between Escondido Transit Center and Nordahl Road station.

COASTER Commuter Rail 

The COASTER is a  commuter rail service that runs north and south between Oceanside and Santa Fe Depot in Downtown San Diego.  A total of 126 trains run every week, with expanded service offered in the spring and summer and additional trains scheduled for special events as needed.

The COASTER's first day of service was February 27, 1995.  The annual ridership is 1.7 million people, with an average weekday ridership of 5,700 people in 2015.  The COASTER route serves 8 stations on its route, including the termini at Oceanside and Santa Fe Depot in Downtown San Diego.  Currently, COASTER equipment consists of 7 locomotives and 28 bi-level coaches. 

The North County Transit District owns and maintains two rail yards for their COASTER commuter rail service. The first yard is the main maintenance and servicing facility located north of Oceanside at Stuart Mesa on Camp Pendleton, and it is shared with Metrolink and the Pacific Sun Railroad. The second yard is shared with the San Diego Trolley at 12th & Imperial in Centre City San Diego; this rail yard stores trainsets during mid-days until they're ready to be used again for northbound services.

LIFT Paratransit Service 

LIFT vehicles provide origin-to-destination service for people with disabilities who are unable to use BREEZE buses due to their disability and have been certified for eligibility, as required by the Americans with Disabilities Act of 1990. Service is available for trips within ¾ mile of fixed bus routes.

The LIFT's first day of service was January 1, 1993.  The American Logistics Company operates the LIFT.

FLEX On-Demand Service 

FLEX is an on-demand service in parts of southwest Carlsbad and Ramona, where BREEZE service is not available. FLEX vehicles take passengers anywhere within the FLEX zone or to the nearest transfer point on the BREEZE, COASTER, or SPRINTER. The American Logistics Company operates the FLEX service.

Organization, policies, and initiatives 
A board of directors governs NCTD.  The board includes members from Carlsbad, Del Mar, Encinitas, Escondido, Oceanside, Solana Beach, San Marcos, Vista, and the San Diego County Board of Supervisors.

Green initiatives 
NCTD has implemented cutting-edge green initiatives and sustainability programs that minimize the environmental impact of public transit.  NCTD recently installed solar panels, saving the agency $1 million in energy costs over five years.  NCTD has increased recycling and improved lighting and is using biodegradable cleaning supplies.  In addition, NCTD has received grant funding to install electric smart car chargers in transit center parking lots.

Pronto Fare System / Former Compass System 

All NCTD and related San Diego Metropolitan Transit System (MTS) services utilize the new Pronto contactless fare system introduced in September 2021 by INIT Systems and SANDAG; the Pronto system succeeded the first-generation Compass Card system." As a replacement for the original "Compass Card," the Pronto fare system allows for a tap-on, tap-off approach through the use of station validators in order to deduct the correct fare; additional measures may need to be taken depending on the service. General Pronto cards can be physically purchased at Pronto ticket vending machines within NCTD facilities, or in NCTD customer service centers; electronic versions can be purchased through the website or through the mobile applications.

Both NCTD and MTS services previously utilized the aforementioned contactless "Compass Card", made possible by Cubic Transportation Systems, Inc. The "Compass Card" allowed passengers from MTS and NCTD to store regional transit passes and cash value on a rewritable RFID card. Customers would have purchased passes and added cash value on the Internet or at any ticket vending machine. Prior to using a provided service, customers tapped their Compass Cards on the ticket validator located at the transit center or station. The LED display on the validator would then light up with lights resembling that of a stoplight, and the LCD display showed text regarding the passenger's fare account.  The new Pronto system now used expanded upon many of the design concepts previously employed with the Compass Card system.

In popular culture 

In 2011, an artist surreptitiously installed a mosaic on the wall of a COASTER bridge near the Encinitas station that came to be known as "Surfing Madonna". In early 2012, the Encinitas City Council voted to accept the mosaic under a long-term loan agreement and to support a proposal to put the mosaic on publicly owned land near Moonlight Beach. The Encinitas City Council stipulated that acceptance of the mosaic is contingent upon the artist, Mark Patterson, signing an agreement that he will pay for the mosaic's removal if it becomes the subject of a religious-imagery lawsuit.

See also 
 San Diego Public Transportation
 San Diego Metropolitan Transit System

References 

 Transit agency faces $3 million budget gap (Union Tribune, May 10, 2008)

External links 
 https://gonctd.com/ - NCTD Website
https://gonctd.com/wp-content/uploads/2019/01/NCTDSystemMap.pdf – NCTD System Map
https://www.sdmts.com/sites/default/files/attachments/rtm_sep2019_web_.pdf – Southern Area System Map

 
Public transportation in San Diego County, California
Bus transportation in California
Passenger rail transportation in California
Intermodal transportation authorities in California
Oceanside, California
1975 establishments in California